Sam Murray (born 2 September 1997) is a former professional Australian rules footballer who played for the Collingwood Football Club in the Australian Football League (AFL). He was drafted by the Sydney Swans with their final selection and sixty-sixth overall in the 2015 rookie draft.

After spending two seasons with Sydney without playing a senior AFL match, he was traded to Collingwood during the 2017 trade period. In round 3, he was nominated for the 2018 AFL Rising Star award.

Murray in August 2018 returned a positive test for a matchday positive for an illicit drug, believed to be cocaine.

At the conclusion of the 2018 season, Collingwood delisted Murray, stating they will re-draft him as a rookie if he is available. A month later, Collingwood re-drafted Murray as a rookie with pick 33. On 26 August 2019, it was announced that Murray would be available to play from the 2020 AFL season, following an 18-month backdated suspension.

On Tuesday the 18th of September, it was announced Murray would not be offered a new contract with Collingwood.

Statistics
 Statistics are correct to the end of the 2019 season

|-style="background:#eaeaea;"
! scope="row" style="text-align:center" | 2016
|style="text-align:center;"|
| 46 || 0 || — || — || — || — || — || — || — || — || — || — || — || — || — || —
|-
! scope="row" style="text-align:center" | 2017
|style="text-align:center;"|
| 46 || 0 || — || — || — || — || — || — || — || — || — || — || — || — || — || —
|-style="background:#eaeaea;"
! scope="row" style="text-align:center" | 2018
|style="text-align:center;"|
| 9 || 13 || 0 || 1 || 158 || 113 || 271 || 67 || 21 || 0 || 0.1 || 12.2 || 8.7 || 20.9 || 5.2 || 1.6
|-
! scope="row" style="text-align:center" | 2019
|style="text-align:center;"|
| 9 || 0 || — || — || — || — || — || — || — || — || — || — || — || — || — || —
|- class="sortbottom"
! colspan=3| Career
! 13
! 0
! 1
! 158
! 113
! 271
! 67
! 21
! 0
! 0.1
! 12.2
! 8.7
! 20.9
! 5.2
! 1.6
|}

References

External links

1997 births
Living people
Collingwood Football Club players
Wodonga Football Club players
Australian rules footballers from Victoria (Australia)